Eccles is a surname. Notable people with the surname include:

 Ambrose Eccles (died 1809), Irish Shakespearean scholar
 Charlotte O'Conor Eccles (1863–1911), Irish writer
 Clancy Eccles (1940–2005), Jamaican musician
 David Eccles (businessman) (1849–1912), American businessman who became Utah's first multimillionaire
 David Eccles, 1st Viscount Eccles (1904–1999), British Conservative politician
 George S. Eccles (1900–1982), American businessman and philanthropist
 Graham Eccles, rugby league footballer of the 1960s, '70s and '80s for Leeds, and Wakefield Trinity
 Henry Eccles (1670–1742), English composer
 Henry Eccles (cricketer) (1863–1931), English cricketer
 Henry E. Eccles (1898–1986), Rear Admiral in the United States Navy
 James Eccles (1838–1915), English mountaineer and geologist 
 J. R. Eccles (1874–1956), English schoolmaster and author 
 John Eccles (disambiguation), several people 
 Marriner Stoddard Eccles (1890–1977), American economist and banker, former Federal Reserve Chairman
 Mary Eccles, Viscountess Eccles (1912–2003), American book collector and scholar
 Nigel Eccles, Northern Irish technology entrepreneur and business executive
 Solomon Eccles (1618–1683), English musician
 Spencer Eccles (born 1934), financier and philanthropist in Salt Lake City, Utah
 Tony Eccles (born 1970), English darts player
 William Eccles (disambiguation), several people

English toponymic surnames